The qualifying round of the 2011 UEFA U-19 Championship was the first of two qualifying rounds for the finals tournament of the 2011 UEFA European Under-19 Championship. During these rounds, 52 national teams competed to determine the seven teams that will join the already qualified host nation Romania.

The first qualifying round was played between 28 September and 30 October 2010. The 52 teams were divided into 13 groups of four teams, with each group being contested as a mini-tournament, hosted by one of the group's teams. After all matches have been played, the 13 group winners and 13 group runners-up advanced to the Elite Round. Alongside the 26 qualifying teams, the two best third-placed teams also qualified.

Groups

Group 1

Group 2

Group 3

Group 4

Group 5

Group 6

Group 7

Group 8

Group 9

Group 10

Group 11

Group 12

Group 13

Ranking of third-placed teams
Ranking includes only matches against group winners and runners-up. The top two, Moldova and the Czech Republic, advanced to the Elite Round.

References

UEFA.com

Qualification
UEFA European Under-19 Championship qualification